Balcan is a surname. Notable persons with that name include:

 George Balcan (19322004), Canadian radio broadcaster and artist
 Maria-Florina Balcan, Romanian-American computer scientist
 Vural Balcan, Turkish fencer who competed at the 1948 Summer Olympics

See also
 Balkan (disambiguation)

Turkish-language surnames